Chishma (Şişmä) is a rural locality (a village) in Neftekamsk, Bashkortostan, Russia. The population was 102 as of 2010. There are two streets.

References

Rural localities in Neftekamsk urban okrug